The 2001 Mid-Continent Conference men's basketball tournament was held March 4–6, 2001, at Allen County War Memorial Coliseum in Fort Wayne, Indiana.
This was the 18th edition of the tournament for the Association of Mid-Continent Universities/Mid-Continent Conference, now known as the Summit League.

 defeated six-time defending champ  62–59 to earn an automatic berth into the 2001 NCAA tournament.

Bracket

References 

Summit League men's basketball tournament
2000–01 Mid-Continent Conference men's basketball season
2001 in sports in Indiana